Sparisjóður Reykjavíkur og nágrennis (English: Reykjavík Savings Bank), often shortened to SPRON was an Icelandic savings bank. It had six branches, all in the Reykjavík capital area. The bank was established March 5, 1932, and was nationalized in 2009 following a major banking and financial crisis in Iceland. Most assets were subsequently moved to Nýja Kaupþing.

External links 

  
  

Banks of Iceland